Beryl A. Radin (born 1936) is an American public administration author, researcher and academic. An elected member of the National Academy of Public Administration, she was the Managing Editor of the Journal of Public Administration Research and Theory from 2000 to 2005.   She created and served as the Editor of the Georgetown University Press book series, Public Management and Change.  Her government service included two years as a Special Advisor to the Assistant Secretary for Management and Budget of the US Department of Health and Human Services and other agencies and a range of consultancies.

Education and positions 
Beryl Radin was born on November 15, 1936, in Aberdeen, South Dakota. She is a first generation American from a Jewish family. She graduated from Antioch College with a BA in history in 1958. She then graduated from the University of Minnesota with a MA in American Studies. She worked as Assistant Information Officer at the United States Commission on Civil Rights from 1963 to 1965. Radin decided to return to school following the 1968 United States presidential election and in 1973 earned her PhD from University of California, Berkeley in Social Policies Planning.

Dr. Radin has been a past president of the Association of Public Policy Analysis and Management and has been active in the public administration section of the American Political Science Association and the Public Management Research Association as well as the International Public Policy Association.

Publications 
Dr. Radin has written more than a dozen books and many articles on public policy and public management issues. Much of her work has focused on policy analysis, intergovernmental relationships and federal management change. Her recent work has focused on comparative policy analysis.   Her most recent books are Defining Policy Analysis:  A Journey that Never Ends (published by Cambridge University Press); Policy Analysis in the Twenty-First Century:  Complexity, Conflict, and Cases (published by Routledge); the second edition of her book on policy analysis, Beyond Machiavelli:  Policy Analysis Reaches Midlife; and Federal Management Reform In a World of Contradictions, both published by Georgetown University Press.

Awards & Achievements 
Dr. Radin received the  2014 International Research Society for Public Management Routledge Prize for Outstanding Contribution to Public Management Research, the John Gaus Award from the American Political Science Association in 2012, and the H. George Frederickson Award for Lifetime Achievement from the Public Management Research Association in 2009.  She was the recipient of the 2002 Donald Stone Award given by the American Society for Public Administration’s section on intergovernmental management to recognize a scholar’s distinguished record.  Dr. Radin was a senior Fulbright lecturer in India and has continued research in that country; she has also been involved in teaching and research in Hong Kong, Israel, Denmark, Azerbaijan and Australia.

References 

Living people
American women political scientists
American political scientists
Public administration scholars
McCourt School of Public Policy faculty
1936 births
American women academics
21st-century American women